The Pipeline Authority Act 1973 was an Act of the Parliament of Australia.

It was enacted by Prime Minister Gough Whitlam and his Labor Party to oversee the planning and construction of a National Pipeline system and its subsequent operation and maintenance.

The Act was repealed by the Energy Legislation Amendment Act 2006.

References

1973 in Australian law
Repealed Acts of the Parliament of Australia
Economic history of Australia
Pipelines in Australia